Juraj Piroska (born 27 February 1987) is a Slovak professional footballer who plays as a midfielder for FC Petržalka.

Club career
Piroska began playing football in Slovan Bratislava at the age of 6. He joined German side SC Freiburg youth squad in 2004. There he spent one-and-a-half years and came back to Slovakia, signing for AS Trenčín. He missed most of the time in Trenčín due to a backbone injury.

In January 2006, he moved to Artmedia Petržalka. His breakthrough came in 2007–08, winning the double.

On 16 February 2009, he signed a three-year contract for Sparta Prague. He played only 16 minutes for Sparta in the Gambrinus liga and moved on loan to Senica in July 2009.

His good form in Senica switched to transfer in June 2010. He scored his first hat-trick in a 5–0 away win against Nitra on 4 March 2011.

International career
Piroska made his debut for the Slovakia national team in a 1–0 away win against Andorra on 26 March 2011. He netted his first goal on 11 October 2011 in a 1–1 away draw with Macedonia in a Euro 2012 qualifier.

Affiliated activities
Piroska appears in RTVS, Slovak public broadcaster, during televised national team or club international fixtures as well as major tournaments, like UEFA Euro 2020, as an expert analyst and panel member.

Career statistics
Score and result list Slovakia's goal tally first, score column indicates score after Piroska goal.

Honours
Artmedia
Corgoň Liga: 2007–08
Slovak Cup: 2007–08

References

External links
FK Senica profile 

1987 births
Living people
Footballers from Bratislava
Slovak footballers
Association football forwards
Slovakia international footballers
ŠK Slovan Bratislava players
SC Freiburg players
AS Trenčín players
FC Petržalka players
AC Sparta Prague players
FK Senica players
FC Kaisar players
Spartak Myjava players
MFK Skalica players
U.S. Vibonese Calcio players
Slovak Super Liga players
2. Liga (Slovakia) players
Czech First League players
Czech National Football League players
Serie C players
Kazakhstan Premier League players
Slovak expatriate footballers
Slovak expatriate sportspeople in Germany
Expatriate footballers in Germany
Slovak expatriate sportspeople in the Czech Republic
Expatriate footballers in the Czech Republic
Slovak expatriate sportspeople in Kazakhstan
Expatriate footballers in Kazakhstan
Slovak expatriate sportspeople in Italy
Expatriate footballers in Italy
Slovak television people